James Harold Evans (March 28, 1939 – February 15, 2021) was an American lawyer and politician who served as the attorney general of Alabama from 1991 to 1995.

Evans was born in Montgomery, Alabama. He went to Huntingdon College and Auburn University. A graduate of the University of Alabama, Evans was also a lawyer in Montgomery, Alabama and a judge for Montgomery County, Alabama. He died of pneumonia and heart attack.

References 

1939 births
2021 deaths
20th-century American judges
20th-century American lawyers
20th-century American politicians
Alabama Attorneys General
Alabama state court judges
Lawyers from Montgomery, Alabama
Politicians from Montgomery, Alabama
University of Alabama School of Law alumni
Huntingdon College alumni
Auburn University alumni
Deaths from pneumonia in Alabama